Bullia mozambicensis is a species of sea snail, a marine gastropod mollusk in the family Nassariidae, the Nassa mud snails or dog whelks.

Distribution
Distribution of Bullia mozambicensis includes:
 Mozambique
 South Coast of South Africa and Natal

The type locality is mouth of the Macusi River, Quelimane, Mozambique.

Description
Bullia mozambicensis was originally discovered and described by British malacologist Edgar Albert Smith in 1877. Smith's original text (the type description) reads as follows:

References
This article incorporates public domain text from the reference

Nassariidae
Molluscs of the Indian Ocean
Gastropods described in 1877
Taxa named by Edgar Albert Smith